Bruno César Zanaki (born 3 November 1988) is a Brazilian professional footballer who plays as an attacking midfielder for XV de Piracicaba.

Club career

Early career 
Bruno César began his professional career with Ulbra in 2009, before moving on to Noroeste in the same season. At Noroeste, he made his senior debut against Ituano in the Campeonato Paulista, where he came on as a 64th-minute substitute.

Following the end of the 2009 Campeonato Paulista, Bruno César moved to Campeonato Brasileiro Série A side Santo André. At Santo André, he made his professional league debut away to Coritiba. His professional league debut saw him score Santo André's fourth in a 4–2 away win. For the 2010 season, he managed to break through into Santo André's starting 11 where he scored 7 goals in 21 appearances and helped his side reach the 2010 Campeonato Paulista final, where his side lost to Santos over two legs.

Corinthians 
Bruno César would join Corinthians from Campeonato Brasileiro Série B side in May 2010. He debuted for the Timão on 27 May in a Campeonato Brasileiro Série A match against Grêmio Barueri. He marked his first team debut with a goal which would tie the match at 2–2. His debut season with Corinthians saw him score 14 goals in 31 matches, which helped his side finish third in the league, thus granting his side qualification to the 2011 Copa Libertadores first stage. His impressive first season with Corinthians would see him be awarded by the Brazilian Football Confederation (CBF) with the Campeonato Brasileiro Série A Best Newcomer award.

Bruno César's second season with Corinthians would see him feature regularly in Corinthians' 2011 Campeonato Paulista campaign, where he helped his side reach the final of the competition, where they were defeated by Santos. Prior to start of the 2011 league campaign, he would be transferred to Benfica.

Benfica 

On 28 March 2011, Benfica announced the acquisition of Bruno César for a reported €6 million transfer fee, with Bruno César moving to the Encarnados in the summer.

Bruno César made his Benfica debut against Trabzonspor in a UEFA Champions League third round qualifying match. On 20 August, he made his Primeira Liga debut against Feirense at the Estádio da Luz, where he scored in injury time. His goal-scoring form in the league would continue in the next several matches with goals against Nacional and Académica de Coimbra.

Bruno César's goal-scoring form would see then Benfica head coach Jorge Jesus select him in his starting 11. Jesus' selection of the player would pay off, as Bruno César scored in Benfica's second Champions League group stage match against Oțelul Galați. He would continue to demonstrate his goal-scoring form, scoring in a third round Taça de Portugal match against Portimonense. In Benfica's next UEFA Champions League match, he would play a pivotal role in an important win – he helped his side pick up an important away win at Basel by scoring Benfica's first goal in a 2–0 win at St. Jakob-Park.

Following his excellent goal scoring form, Bruno César suffered a two-month goal scoring drought through November and December. He ended his scoring drought by scoring in an away match against União de Leiria. After January 2013, Bruno César played an important role in Benfica's end-of-season fortunes. Despite Benfica losing the Primeira Liga title to rivals Porto, he helped his side claim the Taça da Liga title for a fourth consecutive season, and helped the Encarnados reach the quarter-finals of the UEFA Champions League, where they were defeated by eventual winners Chelsea.

The arrivals of wingers Eduardo Salvio and Ola John saw Bruno César feature less for his club side in the domestic league campaign for the 2012–13 season. He would be utilized by Jorge Jesus primarily in the Taça de Portugal, Taça da Liga and the UEFA Champions League campaigns. The first half of the 2012–13 season would see Bruno César make 16 appearances, six of which came in the Primeira Liga. His limited playing time during the first half of the season would see him leave the club in January 2013.

Al-Ahli 
On 21 January 2013, Bruno César joined Saudi club Al-Ahli Jeddah after the club paid Benfica a €5.5 million transfer fee.

Bruno César made his debut for his new club against Al-Wehda in a Saudi Professional League match. He made his continental debut for Al-Ahli in a 2013 AFC Champions League group stage match, against Qatari side Al-Gharafa on 27 February. César would score his first league goal against Ettifaq on 3 March, in a 4–1 away win.

The following week would see Bruno César score again, this time a brace against Najran, which would help his side defeat the opposition 5–1. His goal-scoring form would continue as he scored three goals in continental competitions against Iranian side Sepahan Isfahan (twice) and Qatari side El Jaish.

Sporting CP 
On 31 July 2015, Bruno César joined Estoril from Al-Ahli Jeddah for a €2 million transfer fee. On 14 November 2015, after just 11 matches for Estoril, he joined Sporting CP on a free transfer and signed a four-year contract lasting until June 2020. He scored two goals in his Sporting debut, against Vitória de Setúbal. By the end of the season, he played 18 matches in all competition, scoring four goals.

XV de Piracicaba 
For the 2023 season, Bruno César moved to XV de Piracicaba.

International career 
Bruno César received his first international call-up by Brazil national team manager Mano Menezes for international friendlies against the Gabon and Egypt in November 2011.

César debuted for the Canarinha on 10 November in a 2–0 win against Gabon. His second cap came four days later against Egypt in another 2–0 win.

Career statistics

Club

International

Honours

Club 
Grêmio
 Campeonato Brasileiro Sub-20: 2008
 Taça Belo Horizonte de Juniores: 2008

Corinthians
 Campeonato Brasileiro Série A: 2011

Benfica
 Taça da Liga: 2011–12

Al Ahli
 Saudi Crown Prince Cup: 2014–15

Sporting CP
 Taça da Liga: 2017–18
 Taça de Portugal: 2018–19

Individual 
 Campeonato Brasileiro Série A Best Newcomer: 2010

References

External links 

 Stats at ogol.com.br
 

1988 births
People from Santa Bárbara d'Oeste
Footballers from São Paulo (state)
Living people
Brazilian footballers
Brazil international footballers
Association football midfielders
Association football forwards
Canoas Sport Club players
Esporte Clube Noroeste players
Esporte Clube Santo André players
Sport Club Corinthians Paulista players
S.L. Benfica footballers
Al-Ahli Saudi FC players
Sociedade Esportiva Palmeiras players
G.D. Estoril Praia players
Sporting CP footballers
CR Vasco da Gama players
F.C. Penafiel players
Esporte Clube XV de Novembro (Piracicaba) players
Campeonato Brasileiro Série A players
Primeira Liga players
Saudi Professional League players
Liga Portugal 2 players
Brazilian expatriate footballers
Expatriate footballers in Portugal
Brazilian expatriate sportspeople in Portugal
Expatriate footballers in Saudi Arabia
Brazilian expatriate sportspeople in Saudi Arabia